Carsten Nulle (born 25 July 1975) is a German former professional footballer who played as a goalkeeper.

Career 
Nulle was born in Langen, Hesse. He was the second German player to play in the Polish Premier League (with Górnik Zabrze). Nulle made his debut for Freiburg on 29 April 2007, in a 3–2 win at Kickers Offenbach. In January 2008 he moved to SC Paderborn 07 and in July 2008 to FC Carl Zeiss Jena where he scored his first professional goal in the match against VfL Osnabrück on 20 February 2010.

References

External links 
 
 

1975 births
Living people
German footballers
Footballers from Hesse
Association football goalkeepers
2. Bundesliga players
3. Liga players
Regionalliga players
FSV Frankfurt players
SV Waldhof Mannheim players
Rot-Weiß Oberhausen players
Fortuna Düsseldorf players
SV Sandhausen players
Górnik Zabrze players
SC Freiburg players
SC Paderborn 07 players
FC Carl Zeiss Jena players
KSV Hessen Kassel players
Viktoria Aschaffenburg players
Expatriate footballers in Poland
German expatriate sportspeople in Poland
German expatriate footballers